Nuttallina is a genus of chitons belonging to the family Lepidochitonidae.

The species of this genus are found in the waters of western North America.

Species
The following species are recognised in the genus Nuttallina:

Nuttallina alternata 
Nuttallina californica 
Nuttallina crossota

References

Chitons